Line 1 of the Ürümqi Metro is a subway line in Ürümqi.

The southern section from Balou to Santunbei opened on 28 June 2019.

Line 1 has a total length of 27.615 km and 21 stations. It is fully underground.

History
The 27.615 kilometer long, 21 station line commenced construction in March 2014. Tunneling works were completed in December 2017. The northern section of Line 1 (16.5 km) opened on 25 October 2018. The southern section of Line 1 (11.1 km) opened on 28 June 2019.

Opening timeline

Stations

References

Rail transport in Xinjiang
Rapid transit lines in China
Railway lines opened in 2018
Airport rail links in China